Marcelo Ribeiro Freixo is a Brazilian politician and teacher. He had served as a federal deputy for the Brazilian Socialist Party (PSB), and was formerly chairman of the Defence of Human Rights and Citizenship Commission on the Rio de Janeiro Legislative Assembly.

Freixo gained national attention when he presided over a parliamentary inquiry commission on police militias in Rio de Janeiro, having a character inspired on him in the Brazilian film Elite Squad: The Enemy Within, directed by José Padilha.

He ran for mayor of Rio de Janeiro twice, in 2012 and 2016, having as vice-mayor candidate on the ticket in 2016 the lawyer and professor at UFRJ Luciana Boiteux. He ended in second in both the run-offs, losing the first to Eduardo Paes from PMDB, and the second to the PRB candidate Marcelo Crivella.

On 16 June 2021, Freixo left PSOL for PSB, in preparation for the 2022 Rio de Janeiro gubernatorial election.

References 

|-

1967 births
Living people
People from Niterói
Brazilian Socialist Party politicians
Members of the Legislative Assembly of Rio de Janeiro
Members of the Chamber of Deputies (Brazil) from Rio de Janeiro (state)